is a Japanese anime television series produced by David Production, based on the manga series of the same name by Rumiko Takahashi. It is the second television anime adaptation of the manga, following the 1981 adaptation by Kitty Films that ran until 1986. The series premiered on Fuji TV's Noitamina programming block on October 14, 2022, and is scheduled to run for 46 episodes across four cours, with most episodes having two segments per half-hour.

Production and release
On January 1, 2022, a new television series adaptation was announced and premiered on Fuji TV's Noitamina programming block on October 14, 2022. The series is produced by David Production and chief directed by Hideya Takahashi and Yasuhiro Kimura, with Yūko Kakihara as head writer, character designs by Naoyuki Asano, Takahiro Komei serving as series director and Masaru Yokoyama composing the music. The series was ordered for 46 full-length episodes of four cours, with the first two-cours season set for broadcast. The first cour has 11 episodes and concluded on December 23, 2022. MAISONdes performs the opening and ending themes. For the first 11 episodes, the opening theme is  featuring Minami and SAKURAmoti and the ending theme is  featuring Kaf and Tsumiki. Starting in episode 12, the opening theme is  featuring Asmi and Surii and the ending theme is  featuring Yama and Nito. Sentai Filmworks has licensed the series in North America, Europe, Oceania, and selected Latin American and Asian territories.

Episodes

Home video
In Japan, the series will have two DVD and Blu-Ray box sets in 2023. Volume 1 will be released on March 15, 2023, while volume 2 will be released on June 28, 2023.

Notes

References

External links

 Urusei Yatsura 2022 anime website 
 

Urusei Yatsura
Episodes
Aniplex